Sandusky High School (SHS) is a secondary school in Sandusky, Ohio, United States.  It is the only high school in the Sandusky City School District, and one of two high schools in the city of Sandusky; the other high school is St Mary Central Catholic High School.

SHS was one of the first high schools established in the state of Ohio, with the first building commissioned in 1845.  The first class - just four students - graduated in 1855. The facility is one of the largest secondary schools, under one roof, in the state of Ohio.

Athletics
The sports teams of SHS are called the Blue Streaks and they play in the Sandusky Bay Conference, beginning in 2017.  They played in the Northern Ohio League from 2011-2017 after participating in the Greater Buckeye Conference from 2003-2011. They were previously a part of the Great Lakes League, which was broken up the end of the 2003 season.  SHS is known for its football tradition, as they are currently the fifth winningest team in the history of Ohio high school football with 616 wins. They won several "mythical" state championships before the OHSAA adopted the playoff format that is currently in use, but they have not won a state title since the playoffs began.

Their football team has a passionate rivalry with Fremont Ross High School that dates back to 1895, making it the second-oldest high school football rivalry in Ohio and one of the twenty oldest rivalries in the United States.  Many future NFL and college football stars have participated in this historic game. Heisman Trophy finalist, NFL Pro Bowl selection, and SHS alumnus Orlando Pace and Heisman Trophy winner, NFL Pro Bowl selection, and Fremont Ross alumnus Charles Woodson competed against one another in the game from 1991 to 1993. In 2009, Sandusky played a new rival, Perkins, in their first Varsity Matchup ever, and lost. They played again in 2010, and Sandusky made a comeback. They nicknamed this game the "Hometown Showdown" because Perkins High is less than 2 miles from Sandusky High.

Although SHS is known for its football tradition, they have had great basketball teams and players throughout the school's history as well. Scott May, who went on to become the NCAA Player of the Year on Bobby Knight's undefeated 1976 Indiana Hoosier basketball team, an Olympic Games gold medalist, and the Chicago Bulls' first-round pick of the 1976 NBA Draft, played basketball at Sandusky High School and is the school's all-time leading scorer.

Ohio High School Athletic Association State Championships

 Boys Golf - 1947
 Boys Swimming – 1946
 Boys Track and Field – 1937

Notable alumni
Ed Bettridge, NFL linebacker with the Cleveland Browns (1964 - NFL Champion)
John Bettridge, NFL running back with the Chicago Bears and Cleveland Rams (1937-1938)
Corey Croom, NFL running back with the New England Patriots (1987)
Thom Darden, NFL defensive back with Cleveland Browns (1968)
Luther Henson, NFL defensive nose tackle with the New England Patriots 1982, 1983 and 1984 seasons
Bobby Sprowl, Major League Baseball pitcher with Boston Red Sox and Houston Astros (1978–81)
Scott May, Olympic gold medalist and NCAA national champion basketball player; played for the Chicago Bulls of the NBA
Jackie Mayer, Miss Ohio 1962 and Miss America 1963
John Jay McKelvey, Sr., Attorney, Founder of Harvard Law Review.
Thomas J. Moyer, chief justice of the Ohio Supreme Court (1987 - 2010)
Jim Obergefell, American civil rights activist who was the lead plaintiff in the 2015 U.S. Supreme Court case Obergefell v. Hodges, which legalized same-sex marriage throughout the United States.
Orlando Pace, seven-time Pro Bowl offensive lineman for the St. Louis Rams & Chicago Bears of the NFL
Kevin Randleman, retired professional Mixed Martial Artist formerly competing for Pride Fighting Championships, Strikeforce, and the UFC; two-time national wrestling champion at Ohio State University
Edmund Ross, US Senator from Kansas.
Jeannie Vanasco, American writer.

References

External links
Sandusky High School official website

High schools in Erie County, Ohio
Buildings and structures in Sandusky, Ohio
Public high schools in Ohio
1846 establishments in Ohio